The 1982 Cincinnati Bearcats football team represented University of Cincinnati during 1982 NCAA Division I-A football season. The Bearcats, led by head coach Mike Gottfried, participated as independent.  Beginning in 1982, to meet NCAA Division 1-A stadium capacity requirements, the Bearcats played their home games at Riverfront Stadium.  On-Campus Nippert Stadium was used as a supplement.

Schedule

Roster

References

Cincinnati
Cincinnati Bearcats football seasons
Cincinnati Bearcats football